Fábio Carvalho dos Santos (born April 26, 1978) is a Brazilian–Portuguese goalkeeper who last played for Folgosa da Maia in the Campeonato Distrital da AF Porto. Also played in Argentina for Colegiales and Sarmiento. Later he went back to Portugal to finish his career and helped Vila F.C. to reach the Elite League in Porto.

Club career
After years in his home country, a move to Iran changed his career. In Iran, Carvalho known as Fabio, became a favorite among the Zob Ahan fans. After stiff competition from African counterpart Issa N'Doye. In 2006 Carvalho signed a 2-year contract with Iran's Premier Football League team F.C. Zob Ahan from his previous club GD Estoril-Praia. For the 2008/2009 season he signed a 2-year contract with Aluminium Arak F.C. under the command of Javad Zarincheh. In the following season he was named best goalkeeper of the Iranian Premier League. Fabio Carvalho joined Mes Rafsanjan F.C. towards the end of the end season, and famously saved a number of penalties, helping his side to reach the semi-finals of the Hazfi Cup.

Personal life
He became interested in Iranian culture after visiting Iran. He then married an Iranian woman, Simin Jafari, whom he met while playing for Zob Ahan Club in Isfahan. They have a daughter, Isabella Jafari Carvalho. Fabio now lives in Porto with his family and continue his career around football.

References

1978 births
Living people
Mes Rafsanjan players
Zob Ahan Esfahan F.C. players
Esteghlal Khuzestan players
Association football goalkeepers
Expatriate footballers in Iran
Brazilian expatriates in Iran
Brazilian Shia Muslims
Converts to Shia Islam
CE Mataró players
Persian Gulf Pro League players
Footballers from Rio de Janeiro (city)
Brazilian footballers